Arp 87 (also known as NGC 3808) is a pair of interacting galaxies, NGC 3808A and NGC 3808B. They are situated in the Leo constellation. NGC 3808A, the brighter, is a peculiar spiral galaxy, while NGC 3808B is an irregular galaxy.

The two galaxies were discovered on 10 April 1785 by William Herschel. The two are located about 330 million light-years (100 megaparsecs) away from the Earth. Arp 87 was observed by the Hubble Space Telescope in 2007, which revealed massive clouds of gas and dust flowing from one galaxy to another. Additionally, both galaxies appear to have been distorted.

See also
Atlas of Peculiar Galaxies by Halton Arp

References

External links

087
NGC objects
06643
Interacting galaxies
Intermediate spiral galaxies
Irregular galaxies
Leo (constellation)